Stephanie Young Hwang (born August 1, 1989), known professionally as Tiffany or Tiffany Young, is an American singer-songwriter of Korean descent. Born and raised in California, she was discovered by South Korean entertainment agency SM Entertainment at the age of fifteen and subsequently moved to South Korea. After two years of training, Young debuted as a member of girl group Girls' Generation (and later its subgroup Girls' Generation-TTS) in August 2007, which went on to become one of the best-selling artists in South Korea and one of South Korea's most popular girl groups worldwide.

In 2016, Young became the second Girls' Generation member to debut as a soloist with the release of her first extended play I Just Wanna Dance. Although Young remains a member of Girls' Generation, she left SM Entertainment in October 2017. She is currently based in Los Angeles for her solo career. She joined Paradigm Talent Agency and signed with record label Transparent Arts prior to the release of her 2019 extended play Lips on Lips.

Life and career

1989–2012: Early life and career beginnings

Tiffany Young was born Stephanie Young Hwang on August 1, 1989, in San Francisco, California. Her family currently consists of her father, an older sister, and an older brother. She lived with her family, including her grandparents, who alongside her mother contributed to a mix in Korean and American culture in the household. Her mother died when she was 12 years old, and she is estranged from her father. She grew up in Diamond Bar, California, and was inspired by K-pop artist BoA. Encouraged by her brother, at the age of 15, Young participated in a singing contest. She was spotted by a local SM Entertainment representative, auditioned, and was accepted as a trainee. She moved to South Korea three weeks later.

Young attended Korea Kent Foreign School and was trained at SM Entertainment for almost four years. She officially debuted as a member of South Korean girl group Girls' Generation in August 2007. The singer adopted the stage name Tiffany, the name her mother initially wanted to name her at birth. Besides Girls' Generation, Young‘s early solo work mostly involved songs recorded for side projects and original soundtracks. Throughout her career, she also participated as the host for several television programs. In early 2008, Young was diagnosed with vocal nodules and had to receive medical treatment. The symptoms relapsed in 2009 and 2010 in which the singer had to take a short break from her activities. Young acknowledged her voice became "huskier" and "more mature" as a result.

2012–2016: Girls’ Generation TTS, solo debut and controversy

In December 2011–January 2012, Young debuted as a musical actress through a lead role in the Korean adaptation of musical Fame. She played the character Carmen Diaz, a performing arts student who "hopes to rise to stardom by working tirelessly on her craft". In April 2012, a Girls' Generation subgroup named TTS was formed with Young and fellow members Taeyeon and Seohyun. Their debut EP, Twinkle, debuted at number one on the Gaon Album Chart and went on to become the eighth highest selling album of the year in South Korea with over 140,000 copies sold. The subgroup went on to release two more EPs: Holler (2014) and Dear Santa (2015). In November 2013, Young participated as a contestant in the SBS' reality program Fashion King Korea – a program where South Korean celebrities team up with the nation's top designers to compete in fashion challenges and missions. The singer was paired with designer Ji Il-geun and finished the program in third place.

During the summer of 2015, Young began work on a solo record, with the mentality of it being the "transition into the next chapter of [her] music career." She participated in writing music since 2014, calling it "nerve-wrecking [sic] to put out music [she's] written on [her] own." Young named Girls' Generation's Taeyeon as "a big part" that helped her throughout the preparation process for the album. The two singers have been known to be best friends since Young‘s arrival in South Korea in 2004. The album, titled I Just Wanna Dance, was released in May 2016, making Young the second Girls' Generation member to have a solo debut. Her album met with mixed but generally favorable reviews. Billboards Tamar Herman called the album an "audible canvas to paint a new image for [Young]", elaborating that it "showcases [her] range as an artist." The album, having a more American influence than typical K-pop, debuted at number three on both the Billboard World Albums Chart and South Korea's Gaon Album Chart. It sold 61,409 physical copies and was chosen by Billboard as the seventh best K-pop album of 2016. The lead single, and title track, "I Just Wanna Dance" debuted at number 10 on both the Billboard World Digital Songs Chart and the Gaon Digital Chart. In June 2016, the follow-up single "Heartbreak Hotel", featuring Simon Dominic, was released through SM Station digital music platform. To accompany her solo releases, Young held a series of small concerts titled Weekend during the same month.

In August 2016 during the SMTown Live concert in Tokyo, Young posted photos that involved use of the Japanese flag and Rising Sun Flag imagery to indicate her whereabouts on her social media accounts to interact with fans. Though there was no evidence of ill-intentions, this caused heavy criticism from the Korean public as the timing coincided with Korean Liberation Day, stirring a historical war wound sentiment. This event caused her to step down from Sister's Slam Dunk, a KBS2 variety show that she participated in at that time. Young expressed regret for her actions in two handwritten apologies posted to her social media accounts, acknowledging her lack of history knowledge. After the controversial blunder, some media spoke out in defense of Young, while others questioned the misogyny within Korean society, arguing that it can be "unforgiving" towards a female artist while a male counterpart would not receive the same treatment if the same event had occurred.

In October 2016, Young featured on the Far East Movement single "Don't Speak" for their Identity album. In an interview with Billboard, the hip-hop group said that working with Young "really opened our eyes", commenting on "how versatile her range is as a singer."

2017–present: Departure from SM Entertainment and solo career

Young left SM Entertainment in October 2017 and her future activities with Girls' Generation remain in discussion. She moved back to Los Angeles to study acting and pursue a solo singing career.

On March 14, 2018, Young released a cover of "Remember Me," the theme song of the Pixar film Coco, as a single under the stage name Tiffany Young. In June 2018, it was announced that she would be debuting in the United States under Paradigm Talent Agency. She signed with Transparent Arts as her new record label, with "Over My Skin" as her first U.S. solo single.

Young collaborated with and was made the face for H&M's Autumn 2018 campaign. To coincide with their Divided Music fall campaign, Young released her second U.S. single, "Teach You", which was released on September 28, 2018. In October 2018, Young was the first female K-pop artist to walk the red carpet of the American Music Awards. She released a holiday single, "Peppermint", on November 30, 2018.

On January 9, 2019, Young announced her next single, "Born Again," which would be released on January 24 as the lead single of her next EP, entitled Lips on Lips; the single was moved one day later, on January 25, with Fernando Garibay confirmed as the song's producer. The music video of "Born Again" was released alongside the single on January 25. The EP's title track was released as the second single on February 14. Lips on Lips was released on February 22 and featured songwriting collaborations with artists such as Babyface.

Lips on Lips debuted at number nine on Billboard'''s Heatseekers Albums chart and number thirty on the Independent Albums chart, with 1,000 copies downloaded and 380,000 on-demand audio streams. The EP also peaked at number eight at the Gaon Album Chart, and was certified Platinum in South Korea a week after its release. She promoted the EP through her Lips on Lips Mini Showcase Tour, which spanned eight dates around North America in March 2019. She won Best Solo Breakout at the 2019 iHeartRadio Music Awards, becoming the first female Korean artist to win an iHeartradio Music Award.

Young released a new single, "Magnetic Moon", on August 2, coinciding with her Open Hearts Eve concert in Seoul on the next day, as well as another concert in Bangkok on August 17. Subsequently, she embarked on the Magnetic Moon Tour from October to November 2019, which covered eighteen tour stops in North America.

On February 16, 2021, Young was cast as Roxie Hart in the South-Korean production of the Broadway musical Chicago. To win the role, Young participated in an open audition from which only 22 actors were selected from over a thousand applicants. Young stated that she dreamed of being a musical actress and that Roxie is one of the top three roles she wanted to play.

On June 29, 2021, it was announced that Young would be making her acting debut in a supporting role in JTBC's Reborn Rich television series.

In December 2022, Tiffany signed an exclusive contract with Sublime. In February 2023, Tiffany held a fanmeeting "Forever Wishing" in Thailand.

Activism
Tiffany is an open supporter of the LGBT community. In 2018, she wrote a love letter to the LGBTQ community for Gay Pride Month, stating that she is inspired by the themes the community and that the yearly Pride March "speaks truth on how this world can grow to be a better place". During Pride Month 2021, Tiffany joined Seoul-based LGBT collective Neon Milk along with other queer entertainers to dance to Girls' Generation's 2007 song "Into the New World", now a protest anthem in South Korea. Neon Milk have used the song as their anthem every year for Pride. She later reaffirmed her support for the community on the televised newscast JTBC Newsroom.

Discography

Extended plays
 I Just Wanna Dance (2016)
 Lips on Lips'' (2019)

Concerts

 The Agit: Tiffany's Weekend (2016)
 Lips On Lips North American Mini Showcase Tour (2019)
 Open Hearts Eve (2019)
 Magnetic Moon North American Tour (2019)
 Open Hearts Eve Part Two (2020)

Filmography

Film

Television series

Television show

Web show

Hosting

Musical theatre

Awards and nominations

References

External links

 
  by S.M. Entertainment
 Tiffany Young on YouTube
 

1989 births
Actresses from San Francisco
American expatriates in South Korea
American women pop singers
American musicians of Korean descent
American people of South Korean descent
Musical theatre actresses
Girls' Generation members
Japanese-language singers of South Korea
Korean-language singers of the United States
Mandarin-language singers of South Korea
American K-pop singers
Living people
People from Diamond Bar, California
SM Entertainment artists
South Korean female idols
Singers from San Francisco
21st-century American women singers
21st-century American singers